Anarnatula subflavida is a species of snout moth in the genus Anarnatula. It was described by Harrison Gray Dyar Jr. in 1914, and is known from Panama and Costa Rica.

References

Moths described in 1914
Epipaschiinae
Moths of Central America